Ivan Schannong (24 October 1899 – 19 October 1974) was a Danish boxer who competed in the 1920 Summer Olympics. He was born in Copenhagen and died in Gentofte.

In 1920 he was eliminated in the second round of the welterweight class after losing his fight to the upcoming bronze medalist Frederick Colberg. His grandfather founded a stonemasonry in 1884 which became one of the largest tombstone manufacturers in Scandinavia throughout the 1890s. Ivan Schannong took over charge of the company after the death of his father in 1950.

References

External links
profile

1899 births
1974 deaths
Welterweight boxers
Olympic boxers of Denmark
Boxers at the 1920 Summer Olympics
Danish male boxers
Sportspeople from Copenhagen